Charles Mills (13 July 1755 – 29 January 1826) was a British Member of Parliament and a Director of the British East India Company.

He was the second son of the Revd. John Mills, rector of Barford and Oxhill, Warwickshire and educated at Rugby. He was a partner in the private bank Glyn's and from 1785 to 1815 was also a director of the East India Company, before becoming deputy chairman.

Mills was elected MP for Warwick from 1802 to 1826.

He married his sister-in-law Jane, the daughter of the Hon. Wriothesley Digby of Meriden, Warwickshire. He had no children and was succeeded by his nephews.

References

 

1755 births
1826 deaths
People educated at Rugby School
English bankers
Members of the Parliament of the United Kingdom for English constituencies
UK MPs 1802–1806
UK MPs 1806–1807
UK MPs 1807–1812
UK MPs 1812–1818
UK MPs 1818–1820
UK MPs 1820–1826
Directors of the British East India Company
People from Warwickshire